The Elite Pro Academy is an Indonesian system of youth football leagues that are managed, organised and controlled by the PSSI. The system was introduced in early 2018 and was active for the first time during the 2018 season. The system covers the under-16 since 2018, under-18 and under-20 age groups since 2019 & under-14 age groups since 2022. The league runs in conjunction with the Liga 1 as a developmental league. It is contested by 18 teams which compete in the Liga 1.

Under-14 level

This age group was the first level introduced for Elite Pro Academy on 2022.

Under-16 level

This age group was the first level introduced for Elite Pro Academy on 2018. The league is sponsored by Mola and thus officially known as the Mola Elite Pro Academy.

This league is split into three stages, two group stages and knockout round. For the first round group stage, 18 teams split into three group of six. Group A and B is playing home and away double-game round-robin tournament while Group C played four-series home tournament with five matches for each series. The winners and runner-ups from each group along with two best third-placed teams advanced to second round. In the second round, split into two groups of four and all groups is played on a single-game round-robin home tournament where the winners and runner-ups from each group advance to knockout round.

Under-18 level

This age group for Elite Pro Academy was introduced on 2019. The league is sponsored by Mola and thus officially known as the Mola Elite Pro Academy.

This league format is the same as under-16 league format.

Under-20 level

This age group for Elite Pro Academy was introduced on 2019. Unlike under-16 and under-18 that are organised by PSSI, this age level is organised by PT Liga Indonesia Baru which also organised Liga 1 and Liga 2.

This league format is the same as under-16 and under-18 league format. The difference are in first round it's not played double-game and for Group C only two home tournament, exactly like the dissolved Liga 1 U-19 format.

Broadcasters

Indonesia

U-16 and U-18 
The league is currently broadcast by free-to-air public television network TVRI, Djarum Media's premium multiplatform network Mola through 2022. For the first edition, TVRI and Mola will broadcast from second round, semi finals, and final.

U-20 
The league is currently broadcast by three pay-TV services Telkom Indonesia, MNC Media, and Kompas Gramedia Group.

International (including Indonesia) 
Selected matches of the league are currently streamed live via the official PSSI YouTube channel.

See also

 Liga 1

References

External links
  
  
 

Youth
Youth
Youth
Youth football leagues
Sports leagues established in 2018
Sports leagues established in 2019
Sports leagues established in 2022
2018 establishments in Indonesia
2019 establishments in Indonesia
2022 establishments in Indonesia